Sapientia (minor planet designation: 275 Sapientia) is a very large Main belt asteroid that was discovered by Johann Palisa on 15 April 1888 in Vienna. It is classified as a C-type asteroid and is probably composed of carbonaceous material. It is named for the Roman personification of wisdom, Sapientia.

The light curve was found to be irregular, suggesting the asteroid has an irregular shape. On September 30, 2015, the asteroid was observed occulting the 7th magnitude star HIP 14977 from multiple sites in Europe. The resulting chords showed a nearly circular prolate spheroid profile.

References

External links 
 Lightcurve plot of 275 Sapientia, Palmer Divide Observatory, B. D. Warner (2007)
 Asteroid Lightcurve Database (LCDB), query form (info )
 Dictionary of Minor Planet Names, Google books
 Asteroids and comets rotation curves, CdR – Observatoire de Genève, Raoul Behrend
 Discovery Circumstances: Numbered Minor Planets (1)-(5000) – Minor Planet Center
 
 

Background asteroids
Sapientia
Sapientia
X-type asteroids (Tholen)
C-type asteroids (SMASS)
18880415
Objects observed by stellar occultation